The Dubai Cricket Council Ground No 1 is a cricket venue in Dubai, UAE. The venue has hosted List A Matches during the champions trophy qualifying rounds in 2004/05, which the United States won. The venue has also hosted 2000 Asian Cricket Council Trophy games.

Cricket grounds in the United Arab Emirates
Football venues in the United Arab Emirates
Rugby union stadiums in the United Arab Emirates
Sports venues in Dubai
Rugby union in Dubai
Multi-purpose stadiums in the United Arab Emirates
Dubai Sports City